Seyyed Abdollah or Seyyedabdollah may refer to:
 Seyyed Abdollah, Fars
 Seyyed Abdollah, Khuzestan